The Speaker's Residence is the official residence of the Speaker of the Parliament of Sri Lanka, located in Sri Jayawardenapura-Kotte, Sri Lanka. The current residence was built in 2000 in close proximity to the Parliament Complex.

History
The first official residence of the Speaker of the House of Representatives, Mumtaz Mahal, Colombo was located at Kollupitiya, a suburb of Colombo. However once the Parliament was moved to the new Parliament Complex in Sri Jayawardenapura-Kotte, plans were made to shift the Speaker's Residence to Sri Jayawardenapura-Kotte as well. However this move was delayed by almost twenty years.

External links
 Iftar Ceremony – 2009

See also 
 Parliament of Sri Lanka

Official residences in Sri Lanka
Houses completed in 2000
Houses in Sri Jayawardenepura Kotte